Skåmedal is a village in Bygland municipality in Agder county, Norway.

References

Villages in Agder
Bygland